Luigi Bezzera (born in the 19th century; died in the 20th century) was an Italian mechanic. He is considered to be the co-inventor of the espresso machine, along with Angelo Moriondo.

Career 
Although the original patent for the rapid extraction of coffee with steam and hot water was granted to Angelo Moriondo on 16 May 1884, the method was not initially practical, and machines on this basis were found only in the immediate vicinity of Turin. Bezzera improved this concept and applied for a patent for his innovations on December 19, 1901. These improvements enabled machines with significantly increased throughput and cost-effectiveness. This was crucial for the concept's subsequent success. Bezzera's patent (153/94, 61707) was acquired by Desiderio Pavoni, who founded the company La Pavoni in 1905 .

Pavoni initially kept the old name and began working with Bezzera on mass production in a workshop in Via Parini in Milan. Bezzera had neglected this aspect. In 1906, the espresso machine was exhibited under the name Bezzera L. Caffè Espresso at the World's Fair in Milan.

The term espresso for coffee prepared in this way was used for the first time on this occasion.

Pavoni soon promoted the machine as the "ideal" coffee machine and marketed it under the commercial name Ideale for La Pavoni. Subsequently, Bezzera and Pavoni built independent companies.

The Bezzera company is now run by Luigi Bezzera's great-grandson Luca Bezzera.

The name Bezzera comes from Portuguese and is pronounced in Italy with emphasis on the first syllable.

References

External links 
 A short history of the Italian espresso

Italian inventors
19th-century births
20th-century deaths
Year of birth unknown
Year of death unknown